Pavel Kopytin (born March 17, 1987) is a Russian professional ice hockey player. He is currently playing with Saryarka Karaganda of the Supreme Hockey League (VHL).

Kopytin made his Kontinental Hockey League (KHL) debut playing with Atlant Moscow Oblast during the 2013–14 KHL season.

References

External links

1987 births
Living people
Atlant Moscow Oblast players
HC Sibir Novosibirsk players
Russian ice hockey forwards
Universiade medalists in ice hockey
Universiade bronze medalists for Russia
Competitors at the 2013 Winter Universiade
Sportspeople from Lipetsk